Iacobus de Ispania (James of Hesbaye; died after 1330) was a music theorist active in the southern Low Countries who compiled The Mirror of Music during the second quarter of the 14th century. Before the discovery of his full name, scholars designated him Jacques de Liège.

The Speculum musicae, the longest surviving medieval work on music, was previously attributed to Jean de Muris by Edmond de Coussemaker, until it was discovered that the initial letters of each of the seven books of the treatises spell out the acrostic IACOBUS. Further research associated him with the diocese of Liège, and suggested that he studied in Paris in the late 13th century before returning to Liège to complete the final two books of his treatise. Smits van Waesberghe associated him with Iacobus de Oudenaerde, professor at the University of Paris and canon of Liège, while he has also been identified with the Iacobus de Montibus mentioned in another manuscript.

The discovery of an attribution of the Speculum to a Iacobus de Ispania initially suggested that the author had come from Spain, possibly identifying him with a James of Spain known to have worked in Oxford in the 14th century, suggesting that the connection with Liège was spurious. Further research demonstrated that Ispania more likely refers to Hesbaye, and brought forward further evidence of the author's association with Liège.

Of the seven books of Speculum musicae, the last has received the most attention by recent scholars for its long argument against an unnamed "doctor musicus" (apparently of the Vitrian or a related Ars nova school) and the rhythmic innovations Jacobus was seeing in his time.

See also
Ars antiqua

References

External links
Medieval Treatises on Music
Text (in Latin)

14th-century writers
Belgian male classical composers
Belgian music theorists
People of medieval Belgium
14th-century composers
Medieval male composers
14th-century people of the Holy Roman Empire
Medieval music theorists